Leđan or Legen was an ancient, often described as magical, city from the Croatian mythology and folklore. It features in Ivana Brlić-Mažuranić's Croatian Tales of Long Ago, a collection of Croatian fairy tales dramatised into short stories.

References

Croatian culture
Slavic mythology
Mythological populated places